Melinda Jacques (née Szabó; former Melinda Tóthné Szabó; born 13 October 1971) is a hungarian born French handball player. She played many years for Vasas and the french club Metz.

She was born in Karcag Hungary. She competed at the 2004 Summer Olympics, where France finished 4th.

References

External links

1971 births
Living people
People from Karcag
French female handball players
Olympic handball players of France
Handball players at the 2004 Summer Olympics